Carmen Lebbos (born 22 February 1963) is a Lebanese theater, television, and film actress who has worked in film, television actress. Lebbos has been active since 1981; she has been in several television series and movies including Ziad Doueiri’s West Beirut and Josef Fares’s Zozo.

Biography 
Lebbos was born in Beirut to a working-class family.

Personal life 
Lebbos was in fifteen year long relationship with famed Lebanese musician Ziad Rahbani.

References

1963 births
Lebanese film actresses
Lebanese stage actresses
Lebanese television actresses
Actresses from Beirut
Living people
Lebanese Christians